The University of Manila (UM), is a private, non-sectarian coeducational basic and higher education institution in the heart of Sampaloc District in Manila, Philippines. It was founded on October 5, 1913 as the Instituto de Manila, by Apolinario G. de los Santos, Mariano V. de los Santos, Maria de los Santos, Buenaventura J. Bello and Antonio Rivero. The first three were siblings. They named their school Instituto de Manila, after the city of Manila and Apolinario G. de los Santos was elected as the first director of the school.

The University was first situated in Binondo and offered primary and secondary education. It then moved to Sampaloc, Manila.

Facilities

International Language School

The International Language School offers courses in the English language to foreign students like the Chinese, Japanese, and Koreans. It also offers courses in the Chinese language and Japanese (Nihongo) language. The International Language School building likewise provides accommodations for foreign students.

Emiramona Garden Hotel
 The Emiramona Garden Hotel serves as a training center of the Hotel and Restaurant Management and Tourism students of the university, and is located at Tagaytay City.

Sports
The University of Manila was one of the original members of the National Collegiate Athletic Association (NCAA), which was founded in 1924. The university was also a former member of the University Athletic Association of the Philippines from 1952 to 1954. Its varsity, the UM Hawks, joined the National Athletic Association of Schools, Colleges and Universities (NAASCU) from 2001 to 2012 where it won seven championships.

Inter-university relations
On April 7, 1957, UM entered into a sisterhood relationship with Dohto University of Sapporo and Monbetsu cities, Hokkaido, Japan. Since then, it has undertaken various projects including faculty exchange visits, and technological and library assistance. UM students have also been given the opportunity to study at Tokai University in Tokyo, Japan through an arrangement with the Philippine-Japan Students' Friendship Exchange Association (or P-JSFEA). A score later, October 31, 1977, UM suggested a sisterhood relationship with Hansung University in Seoul, South Korea. On January 1, 1997, in Taipei, UM's high-school department and building also linked a sisterhood relationship with Cheng Kung Commercial and Technical High School in Pate City, Taiwan, Republic Of China where UM students can work independently. A sisterhood relationship was again entered into by the university with Meio University of Nago City, Okinawa, Japan on Dec. 5, 1988 when UM announced a plan for its sisterhoods.

Notable alumni
 Emmanuel Pelaez - 6th Vice President of the Philippines
 R. Lee Ermey - late Hollywood actor
 Fabian Ver - late military officer, chief of staff, and martial law enforcer
 Alex Niño - comic artist
 Alejo Santos - World War II hero and late Governor of Bulacan
 Oscar Moreno - Mayor of Cagayan de Oro
 Alberto A. Villavert - late Governor of Antique
 Dimasangcay Pundato - late Moro revolutionary leader and undersecretary of the Office of the Presidential Adviser on the Peace Process
 Dominador Aytona  - late Secretary of Finance of the Philippines, senator, lawyer
 Reynel Hugnatan - professional basketball player
 Ronnie Matias - professional basketball player

Affiliations
The University of Manila is an active member of the Philippine Association of Colleges and Universities (PACU), Commission on Higher Education, Association of Southeast Asian Institutions of Higher Learning (ASAIHL), Philippine Association of Colleges and Universities Commission on Accreditation (PACUCOA), Philippine Association of Teacher Education (PAFTE), Philippine Society for Educational Research and Evaluation (PSERE), the University Belt Consortium, and the International Association of Universities.

References

External links
 

Manila, University of
Education in Sampaloc, Manila
Universities and colleges in Manila
1913 establishments in the Philippines